Give It Away may refer to:

Albums
Give It Away (The Chi-Lites album) (1969)
Give It Away (Gaither Vocal Band album) (2006)
Give It Away (Paul Brandt album) (2011)

Songs
"Give It Away" (Deepest Blue song) (2004)
"Give It Away" (George Strait song) (2006)
"Give It Away" (Red Hot Chili Peppers song) (1991)
"Give It Away", by The Fray on the album Helios
"Give It Away", by James on the album Pleased to Meet You
"Give It Away", by Zero 7 on the album Simple Things (2001)

See also
Give It Up (disambiguation)
Give It All Away (disambiguation)
Give Yourself Away, Robbie Seay Band album (2007)
"Givin' Yourself Away", Ratt song (1990)